Clarence Henry "Happy" Day (June 14, 1901 – February 17, 1990), later known as Hap Day, was a Canadian professional hockey player who played 14 seasons in the National Hockey League for the Toronto Maple Leafs and New York Americans. Day enjoyed a 33-year career as a player, referee, coach and assistant general manager, 28 of which were spent in various capacities with the Maple Leafs.  He was inducted into the Hockey Hall of Fame in 1961.

His name appears on the Stanley Cup 7 times—1932 (as Captain), 1942, 1945, 1947, 1948, 1949 (as coach) and 1951 (as assistant manager); all with the Maple Leafs.

Early life
Day was born in Owen Sound, Ontario. During his teenage years, his family moved to Port McNicoll, Ontario, a small village outside of Midland, Ontario. While developing his early hockey skills, Day skated with the Midland Juniors, and while attending Midland High School, wore the uniform of its hockey team. Legend has it that he'd often walk from Port McNicoll to Midland (approximately three kilometres away) in the winter, for games at the town's Casino Rink.

Day played senior lacrosse in Hamilton, Ontario in the early 1920s. He was teammates and roommates with future professional hockey players Carson Cooper, and future Canadian Amateur Hockey Association president Frank Sargent.

Career
He played for the Hamilton Tigers of the Ontario Hockey Association in 1922–23 and 1923–24, and then joined the varsity team at the University of Toronto, where he was enrolled as a pharmacy major. Day was persuaded to turn professional in 1924 by Charlie Querrie, owner of the Toronto St. Pats. He played left wing in his rookie season and then switched to defence, where he would remain for the rest of his career. He became team captain in 1926.

In 1927, the St. Pats were purchased by Conn Smythe and renamed the Toronto Maple Leafs. Smythe kept Day as team captain.  He also became a partner in Smythe's sand and gravel business. After Smythe acquired star defenceman King Clancy from the Ottawa Senators in 1931, Day and Clancy formed one of the top defence pairings in the NHL. The team won the Stanley Cup in 1932. While still playing for the Leafs, Day became coach of the West Toronto Nationals OHA junior team and led them to a Memorial Cup victory in 1936. On September 23, 1937, Day was sold to the New York Americans and spent one season there before retiring as a player in 1938.  His 11-year tenure as captain of the St. Pats/Maple Leafs is second only to George Armstrong.

Day worked as a referee for the next two years before returning to the Leafs as coach. He guided the team through the 1940s, winning the Stanley Cup five times in 10 seasons.  He was the winningest coach in Maple Leafs history until Punch Imlach passed him; Day still ranks second on the franchise wins list behind Imlach.

Smythe promoted Day to assistant general manager in 1950. His name was engraved on the cup a 7th time in 1951. In 1955, Smythe gave Day control over most hockey operations, but remained general manager on paper.  Just after the Leafs were eliminated in the playoffs in March 1957, Day was publicly embarrassed by Smythe, who told the media that he didn't know if Day was available to return to the Leafs for the following season. Officially, Day resigned, but behind the scenes he had been pushed out and was replaced by a committee headed by Smythe's son Stafford Smythe.

Later life
Day retired to enter business life, running Elgin Handles in St. Thomas, Ontario until selling it to his son in 1977. Day was almost convinced by Jack Kent Cooke to become the first general manager of the Los Angeles Kings in 1967, but he decided not to take the job, recommending Larry Regan instead.

Day died in St. Thomas at age 88 in 1990. He and his number 4 were honoured (but not retired) by the Maple Leafs on October 4, 2006 at the Air Canada Centre. However, in 2016, the Maple Leafs retired his number, as part of their Centennial season celebrations.

Career statistics

Regular season and playoffs

* Stanley Cup Champion.

Coaching record

References

External links

1901 births
1990 deaths
Canadian ice hockey defencemen
Hockey Hall of Fame inductees
Ice hockey people from Ontario
New York Americans players
Sportspeople from Owen Sound
Stanley Cup champions
Stanley Cup championship-winning head coaches
Toronto Maple Leafs coaches
Toronto Maple Leafs executives
Toronto Maple Leafs players
Toronto St. Pats players
Canadian ice hockey coaches
Canadian expatriate ice hockey players in the United States